Kanpur is a village in the Arambagh CD block  in the Arambagh subdivision of Hooghly district in the Indian state of West Bengal.

Geography

Location
Kanpur is located at

Area overview
The Arambagh subdivision, presented in the map alongside, is divided into two physiographic parts – the Dwarakeswar River being the dividing line. The western part is upland and rocky – it is extension of the terrain of neighbouring Bankura district. The eastern part is flat alluvial plain area.  The railways, the roads and flood-control measures have had an impact on the area. The area is overwhelmingly rural with 94.77% of the population living in rural areas and 5.23% of the population living in urban areas.

Note: The map alongside presents some of the notable locations in the subdivision. All places marked in the map are linked in the larger full screen map.

Demographics
As per the 2011 Census of India, Kanpur had a total population of 2,657 of which 1,361 (51%) were males and 1,296 (49%) were females. Population in the age range 0–6 years was 260. The total number of literate persons in Kanpur was 1,967 (82.06% of the population over 6 years).

Culture
David J. McCutchion mentions the Kanakesvara temple as an eka ratna with open verandah all round having arhes on wall sections He feels that such eka ratna design may have originated from the rekha  deul. It is brick temple, possibly built in the 19th century, having slight plasterwork.

The photographer has added a note: The Kanakeswar Shiva temple is a prominent religious centre in the area. The Gajan festival of Lord Shiva and the Kalu Rai fair are celebrated with pomp and splendour.

Kanpur picture gallery

References

External links

Villages in Hooghly district